Peter McArthur may refer to:
 Peter McArthur (writer) (1866–1924), Canadian writer and farmer
 Peter McArthur (politician) (1937–2017), member of the Victorian Legislative Assembly
 Pete MacArthur (born 1985), American ice hockey player